Cape Negro ("Black Cape") may refer to

 Cape Negro, Tunisia
 Cape Negro, Nova Scotia
 Cabo Negro, Morocco